is a collection of choral settings by the English composer Herbert Howells of the canticles for the Anglican services of Mattins, Holy Communion and Evening Prayer. Scored for four-part choir, solo tenor and organ, the pieces were written between 1944 and 1956 "for the King's College, Cambridge" ( in Latin). The first of the pieces were first published by Novello in 1947, and they have become a popular piece of music in the Anglican church music repertoire.

Text 

Mary sings the Magnificat ("My soul doth magnify the Lord") on the occasion of her visit to Elizabeth, as narrated in the Gospel of Luke. Simeon sings the Nunc dimittis ("Lord, now lettest thou thy servant depart in peace") when Jesus is presented in the temple.

Howells also set the text of the Office of the Holy Communion to music; like the morning and evening offices, the text is taken from the Book of Common Prayer. Each section is titled in Greek or Latin, but the text is in the English translation, and the Gloria is sung at the end of the service according to the liturgy of the Book of Common Prayer.

Composition 

In 1941, Howells took the post of acting organist of St John's College, Cambridge, standing in for Robin Orr who was away on active service in World War II. Howells attended a tea party held by Eric Milner-White, then Dean of King's College. There, he also met the Director of Music at King's, Boris Ord, and the organist of Gonville and Caius College, Patrick Hadley. The three men challenged Howells to a bet of one guinea that he could not compose a canticle setting for the Choir of King's College Chapel.

He revisited the music in 1956 for his setting of the Office of the Holy Communion (Collegium Regale). Praising the Collegium Regale settings, Paul Spicer, a pupil of Howells, has stated that "one guinea kickstarted music for the Anglican Church into a whole new phase of existence".

Howells's Collegium Regale evening canticles are among his best-known works and noted for their use of choral voices. While many Anglican settings of the  begin with full choir or male voices, Howells opens the work with  treble voices, emphasising the feminine voice of Mary's song. Explaining his choice of voices, Howells stated that "… if I made a setting of the Magnificat, the mighty should be put down from their seat without a brute force which would deny this canticle’s feminine association. Equally, that in the Nunc dimittis, the tenor’s domination should characterize the gentle Simeon. Only the Gloria should raise its voice."

Recordings

 A Celebration Of Herbert Howells — The Choir of King's College, Cambridge, Stephen Cleobury (Argo, 1992)
 Howells: Requiem, Take Him, Earth, For Cherishing (And Other Choral Works), Choir Of St John's College, Cambridge, Christopher Robinson, Iain Farrington (Naxos, 1999)

See also
List of compositions by Herbert Howells

References 

Works cited

External links 
 Keller, Benjamin T.: An Historical Perspective on the Choral Music of Herbert Howells as Found in the Anglican Canticle Settings Magnificat and Nunc Dimittis for Saint Paul's Cathedral (Dissertation) University of Arizona 1986

Choral compositions
Col Reg
1944 compositions
Compositions by Herbert Howells
King's College, Cambridge
Te Deums